= Western Sydney Football Club =

Western Sydney Football Club may refer to:

- Western Sydney Wanderers FC, Australian professional soccer club
- Greater Western Sydney Giants, Australian rules football team
